Rally Speedway (also known as John Anderson's Rally Speedway) is a top-down racing game developed by John Anderson for the Atari 8-bit family and published by Adventure International in 1983. The Atari version was released on cartridge. It was ported to the Commodore 64 and published by Commodore in 1985. The game includes an editor allowing players to create and save their own race tracks.

Gameplay
Rally Speedway shows a birds-eye view of a small section of a larger race track that scrolls. Single-player and two-player modes are available, with no computer-controlled opponents present in either mode. In the single-player game, the player races against time. The only goal is to improve one's lap time while avoiding various roadside objects.

In the two-player mode, players race against each other over a set amount of laps (three by default). Both players share the same view of the track. Player vehicles get near the screen's edges when the distance between them grows. Once one player gets too far behind, she receives a 5-second time penalty, and both players are placed together at the current location. A player that crashes receives a 10-second penalty.

There are options for changing top speed and acceleration, road surface, and even enabling immunity to crashes.

Rally Speedway includes an editor for creating new tracks and loading saving them on cassette or disk.

Reception
Lee Pappas of ANALOG Computing wrote in January 1984 that Rally Speedway "is one of the nicest designed and executed games for the [Atari 8-bit]". In the May 1984 issue of Electronic Games, Bill Kunkel praised the graphics and the variety of menu options for customizing the game, calling it "a virtual role model for games of this type." A 1984 review in Hi-Res magazine called Rally Speedway "graphically gorgeous" but criticized the top-down perspective for being less exciting than a behind-the-car view.

Legacy
Rally Speedway'''s concept of two-player gameplay served as a template for the implementation of the head-to-head mode in the Codemasters game Micro Machines. In the latter, the concept was modified by introducing a scoring system instead of time penalties.

See alsoAuto Racing, 1980 Intellivision game with similar visuals and gameplayRacing Destruction Set, 1985 racing game with a track editor

References

External links
 Rally Speedway at Atari Mania
 
Review in GAMES'' magazine

1983 video games
Adventure International games
Atari 8-bit family games
Commodore 64 games
Top-down racing video games
Video games developed in the United States